Addie James Morrow (17 July 1928 in County Down, Northern Ireland – 30 March 2012 in County Down) was a politician in Northern Ireland.

Born on a farm in County Down, Morrow was an early member of the ecumenical Corrymeela Community, later led by his brother John.

Morrow was an early member of the Alliance Party of Northern Ireland (APNI), and was elected to Castlereagh Borough Council in 1973, holding his seat at each subsequent election, until standing down in 1989.

In 1982, Morrow was elected to the Northern Ireland Assembly, representing Belfast East.  At the 1983 general election, he stood unsuccessfully in Strangford, taking 15% of the vote.  In 1984, under John Cushnahan, Morrow became APNI's deputy leader.

At the 1987 general election, Morrow increased his share of the vote in Strangford to 20%.  For the 1992 general election, he switched to contest North Down, taking just under 15%.  Morrow became APNI's chair, but stood down in 1993, citing disappointment at the failure of other parties to use the Brooke-Mayhew Talks to reach agreement.  Morrow later became APNI's President.
Morrow died on 30 March 2012 in his family home on the farm he was brought up in. He was 83 years old.

References

Alliance Party of Northern Ireland politicians
Northern Ireland MPAs 1982–1986
People from County Down
Politicians from Northern Ireland
1928 births
2012 deaths
Alliance Party of Northern Ireland councillors
Members of Castlereagh Borough Council